Kadıköy is a belde (town) in the central district of Yalova Province, Turkey. The population of Kadıköy is 5414  as of 2010. The settlement was founded  by an Ottoman kadı ("judge") . Hence it was named as Kadıköy ("Judge's village"). During Ottoman Empire most of the population was composed of Greeks. But according to Population exchange between Greece and Turkey agreement the Greek population was replaced by Turkish population from Greece. Refugees from Caucasus after the Russo-Turkish War (1877-1878) were also settled in the village. The village was declared a seat of township in 1991. Intensive farming such as green house farming and floriculture is the main economic activity of the town.

References

Populated places in Yalova Province
Towns in Turkey
Yalova Central District